Luis Moreno may refer to:

Luis Antonio Moreno, retired Colombian footballer
Luis Alberto Moreno, Colombian diplomat, president of the Inter-American Development Bank 
Luis G. Moreno, U.S. diplomat
Luis Moreno Ocampo, Argentine jurist, chief prosecutor of the International Criminal Court
Luis Moreno (footballer) (born 1981), Panamanian footballer
Luis Eduardo Moreno (1934–1996), Colombian preacher
Luis Gabriel Moreno (born 1998), Filipino archer

See also
Moreno (disambiguation)